Ramik Wilson (born August 19, 1992) is a former American football linebacker. He played college football at Georgia.

Early years
Wilson attended Jefferson High School in Tampa, Florida, where he played football and ran track. In football, he played linebacker, tight end and punter. As a junior, he recorded 92 tackles, nine sacks and two interceptions. As a senior, he recorded 90 tackles, 18 sacks and six forced fumbles on defense, and also caught 19 passes for 258 yards and five touchdowns on offense. In track & field, Wilson competed as a sprinter, running the 200-meter dash, and as a shot putter and discus thrower. In addition, he also bench-pressed 350 pounds and squatted 470 pounds.

Regarded as a four-star recruit by Rivals.com, Wilson was ranked as the No. 229 player in the country, No. 58 player in Florida and No. 12 linebacker. According to Scout.com, he was rated a three-star recruit, and was ranked as the No. 27 outside linebacker in the country. He committed to play college football at the University of Georgia in January 2011.

College career

Wilson was a backup his first two seasons at Georgia. He appeared in 18 games, recording 10 tackles. As a junior in 2013, Wilson was a first year starter, starting 12 of 13 games. He finished the season with a SEC-leading 133 tackles and also had four sacks. He was named a first-team All-SEC selection for his play.

Professional career

Kansas City Chiefs
The Kansas City Chiefs selected Wilson in the fourth round (118th overall) of the 2015 NFL Draft. He was the 12th linebacker selected in 2015.

On May 11, 2015, the Kansas City Chiefs signed Wilson to a four-year, $2.80 million contract.

Ramik recovered a fumble for his first NFL touchdown against the Chicago Bears on October 11, 2015. 

On September 4, 2016, he was waived by the Chiefs. The next day, he was signed to the Chiefs practice squad. He was promoted to the active roster on October 18, 2016.

Los Angeles Rams
On March 22, 2018, Wilson signed a one-year contract with the Los Angeles Rams. He played in 16 games with four starts, recording 35 combined tackles, two passes defensed and a forced fumble.

Jacksonville Jaguars
On May 1, 2019, Wilson signed with the Jacksonville Jaguars. He was released during final roster cuts on August 30, 2019.

Arizona Cardinals
On October 9, 2019, Wilson was signed by the Arizona Cardinals. On October 22, 2019, Wilson was cut by the Cardinals.

Carolina Panthers
On December 11, 2019, Wilson was signed by the Carolina Panthers. He was released on December 21.

References

External links
 Georgia Bulldogs bio
 Kansas City Chiefs bio

1992 births
Living people
Players of American football from Tampa, Florida
American football linebackers
Georgia Bulldogs football players
Kansas City Chiefs players
Los Angeles Rams players
Jacksonville Jaguars players
Arizona Cardinals players
Carolina Panthers players